The Modesto and Empire Traction Company  is a Class III short-line railroad operating in California's San Joaquin Valley. It is owned by the Beard Land & Investment Company; the Beard family has always owned the railroad. The Beards also created the Beard Industrial Park where the MET's customers are located. The railroad was unique in that it had operated for nearly 50 years exclusively with GE 70-ton switchers built between 1947 and 1955; however, a former Southern Pacific EMD SW1500 switcher was added to the roster as of late. The MET interchanges with the Union Pacific (ex-Southern Pacific) at Modesto and with the BNSF Railway Stockton Subdivision (ex-Santa Fe) at Empire.

Traffic
The MET handles 24,000 cars per year (1996 estimate).

Products shipped include:
Food products
Wine  
Syrup
Plastic
Paper Products

History
The MET was incorporated on October 7, 1911, by Mr. T. K. Beard. On November 1, 1911, it leased the electrified Modesto Interurban Railway (MIR).  Passenger service was the primary service for the railroad when it started in November 1911, but only lasted until 1917.  The MET went to diesel-only operation in March 1952.

Modesto Interurban Railway
The Modesto Interurban Railway was incorporated on March 23, 1909, with plans to build  of track from Modesto along McHenry Avenue and then directly to Riverbank. The Modesto Interurban Railway linked the Santa Fe with Modesto. On April 12, 1909, the grading commenced. Just days before the Modesto & Empire Traction began taking over the railroad, the Modesto Interurban Railway completed construction and operated its first train. By November 1, 1911, the Modesto & Empire Traction was leasing the railway.

References

Further reading

External links

Official MET Webpage

California railroads
Switching and terminal railroads